Christine Garban-Labaune is a French plasma physicist known for her research in inertial confinement fusion.

Education and career
After earning a doctorate from the École Polytechnique in 1982, Labaune became the head of the Interaction Laser-Plasma research team in the laboratory for the use of intense lasers at the École Polytechnique in 1984. She is a director of research in the French National Centre for Scientific Research.

Recognition
In 2001, Labaune was named a Fellow of the American Physical Society (APS), after a nomination from the APS Division of Plasma Physics, "for the most comprehensive study of parametric instabilities in laser produced plasmas, using novel and advanced applications of Thomson Scattering". She was named a chevalier of the Legion of Honour in 2010.

References

Year of birth missing (living people)
Living people
French women physicists
French plasma physicists
Fellows of the American Physical Society
Chevaliers of the Légion d'honneur
École Polytechnique alumni